The 2010 Belgian Figure Skating Championships took place between 20 and 21 November 2009 in Liège. Skaters competed in the disciplines of men's singles and ladies' singles across the levels of senior, junior, novice, as well as the age-group levels of minime/miniem A, B, and C.

Skaters from Austria and South Africa competed as guest skaters and their results were discounted from the final results.

Senior results

Men

Ladies

 WD = Withdrawn

Junior results

Men

Ladies

Novice results

Girls

External links
 2010 Belgian Championships
 Belgian Championships 2010 results
 

Belgian Figure Skating Championships
Belgian Figure Skating Championships, 2010
2009 in figure skating